A Cheeky Vimto is an alcoholic cocktail.

Preparation
The cocktail is made up of ruby port and Blue WKD. Though the owners of Vimto decided they would not manufacture an alcopop version, the company has encouraged its use as a mixer. Many establishments give the Cheeky Vimto other names in order to avoid breaching the trademark of the soft drink. A variation consisting of the port and WKD, without the Vimto, was described in Amy Winehouse's biography as one of her beverages of choice. In May 2018 WKD released a canned version of their drink called "Cheeky V", described as "Port Blue and Lemonade Flavour".. If spilt on carpet, it can be cleaned up using salt.

See also

  – another cocktail named after a commercial soft drink, which similarly does not contain that drink.
  - a cocktail named in reference to its visual resemblance to a non-alcoholic drink which is generally not used as an ingredient in the cocktail.

References

Alcopops
Cocktails with fortified wine